Alishahi (also Romanized as ‘Alīshāhī; also known as Khāneh Sorkh) is a village in Gevar Rural District, Sarduiyeh District, Jiroft County, Kerman Province, Iran. At the 2006 census, its population was 279, in 57 families.

References 
 no

Populated places in Jiroft County